Tom Mercier (born 30 November 1993) is a French-Israeli actor and comedian.

Background
Tom Mercier was born in Tel Aviv, Israel. He is the son of French-born hairdresser and entrepreneur Michel Mercier and Israeli diamond maker Ronit Silberstein. He was raised in the suburb of Herzliya along Israel's Mediterranean Sea coast.

Career
His acting debut was in Nadav Lapid's drama film Synonyms which won the Golden Bear award at the 69th Berlin International Film Festival in  2019. For his role as Yoav in Synonyms, he was nominated for the Ophir Award and the Lumière Award 2020 as most promising actor. 

In 2020, Mercier starred in We Are Who We Are, a limited series directed by Luca Guadagnino, which premiered on HBO.

Filmography

References

External links

1993 births
Living people
People from Tel Aviv
Beit Zvi School for the Performing Arts alumni
Israeli male film actors
Israeli male stage actors
Israeli male comedians
Jewish Israeli male actors
Jewish Israeli comedians
Jewish French male actors
21st-century Israeli male actors
21st-century Israeli comedians